Madeley is a civil parish in the district of Newcastle-under-Lyme, Staffordshire, England.  It contains 38 listed buildings that are recorded in the National Heritage List for England.  Of these, one is listed at Grade I, the highest of the three grades, one is at Grade II*, the middle grade, and the others are at Grade II, the lowest grade.  The parish contains the villages of Madeley and Onneley and the surrounding countryside.  Most of the listed buildings are houses and associated structures, cottages, farmhouses and farm buildings.  The other listed buildings include a church, monuments in the churchyard, the remains of a castle and a manor house, almshouses, a drinking fountain, mileposts, a school, a war memorial, and a telephone kiosk.


Key

Buildings

References

Citations

Sources

Lists of listed buildings in Staffordshire
Borough of Newcastle-under-Lyme